Avengers: Endgame is a 2019 American superhero film based on the Marvel Comics superhero team the Avengers. Produced by Marvel Studios and distributed by Walt Disney Studios Motion Pictures, it is the direct sequel to Avengers: Infinity War (2018) and the 22nd film in the Marvel Cinematic Universe (MCU). Directed by Anthony and Joe Russo and written by Christopher Markus and Stephen McFeely, the film features an ensemble cast including Robert Downey Jr., Chris Evans, Mark Ruffalo, Chris Hemsworth, Scarlett Johansson, Jeremy Renner, Don Cheadle, Paul Rudd, Brie Larson, Karen Gillan, Danai Gurira, Benedict Wong, Jon Favreau, Bradley Cooper, Gwyneth Paltrow, and Josh Brolin. In the film, the surviving members of the Avengers and their allies attempt to reverse Thanos's actions in Infinity War.

Avengers: Endgame premiered in Los Angeles on April 22, 2019, and was theatrically released in the United States on April 26, as part of Phase Three of the MCU. Made on a production budget of $356–400million, Endgame grossed $2.798 billion worldwide, surpassing Infinity Wars entire theatrical run in just eleven days and breaking numerous box office records, including becoming the highest-grossing film of all time from July 2019 until March 2021. On the review aggregator website Rotten Tomatoes, the film holds an approval rating of  based on  reviews.

The film has received various awards and nominations. Avengers: Endgame received a nomination for Best Visual Effects at the 92nd Academy Awards. It won six of fourteen nominations at the 45th Saturn Awards.

Accolades

Notes

References

External links
 

Avengers (comics) lists
Avengers (film series)
Marvel Cinematic Universe lists of accolades by film
Marvel Cinematic Universe: Phase Three